David Cortés Armero (born 1 May 1992) is a Colombian professional footballer who plays as a forward for Jaguares.

References

External links 
 

1992 births
Living people
Colombian footballers
Colombian expatriate footballers
Categoría Primera A players
Moldovan Super Liga players
Cortuluá footballers
FK Jelgava players
FC Sheriff Tiraspol players
FK Spartaks Jūrmala players
FC Salyut Belgorod players
Unión Magdalena footballers
C.D. Quevedo footballers
Deportivo Pereira footballers
Correcaminos UAT footballers
América de Cali footballers
Expatriate footballers in Latvia
Expatriate footballers in Moldova
Expatriate footballers in Russia
Expatriate footballers in Mexico
Expatriate footballers in Ecuador
Expatriate footballers in Peru
Colombian expatriate sportspeople in Latvia
Colombian expatriate sportspeople in Moldova
Colombian expatriate sportspeople in Russia
Colombian expatriate sportspeople in Mexico
Colombian expatriate sportspeople in Ecuador
Colombian expatriate sportspeople in Peru
Footballers from Bogotá
Association football forwards